Adi Litiana Maopa (1864-1933) was a prominent member of two of Fiji's main chiefly houses, those of the Tui Nayau, the paramount chief of the Lau Islands, and the chiefly house of the Vunivalu of Bau the paramount chief of the Kubuna Confederacy.

Adi Maopa's father, Ratu Tevita Uluilakeba II was the heir to the Tui Nayau, Taliai Tupou, he died prematurely before succeeding to it. As such Adi Maopa was a member of the ruling Vuanirewa dynasty, belonging to the noble house Matailakeba. Her mother was Adi Asenaca Kakua, a daughter of the Tui Viti and Vunivalu of Bau, Ratu Seru Epenisa Cakobau, via his union with Adi Litia Samanunu.

She married Ratu Joni Madraiwiwi I in November, 1886, with whom she had six children, including Adi Vuikaba, Ratu Tiale Vuiyasawa, Adi Salote Mokoiwaqa, Adi Kacaraini Loaloakubou and Ratu Sir Josefa Vanaaliali Lalabalavu Sukuna, one of Fiji's greatest statesmen of the 20th century, not to mention her youngest child - Dr Ratu Jione Atonio Rabici Doviverata, father of former Vice-President and Roko Tui Bau, Ratu Joni Madraiwiwi.

References

Fijian chiefs
People from Lakeba
People from Bau (island)
Tui Kaba
Vuanirewa
1864 births
1933 deaths